Tarrocanus is a genus of crab spiders in the family Thomisidae, containing only two species.

Species
 Tarrocanus capra Simon, 1895 — Sri Lanka
 Tarrocanus viridis Dyal, 1935 — Pakistan

References

Thomisidae
Araneomorphae genera
Spiders of Asia